Codex Vaticanus 1339 is a manuscript of the treatise On the Soul of Aristotle. It is designated by symbol P. Paleographically it had been assigned to the 14th or 15th century. It is written in Greek minuscule letters. The manuscript contains a complete text of the treatise. 

The text of the manuscript is eclectic. It represents to the textual family σ, in book II of treatise, from II, 2, 314 b 11 to II, 8, 420 a 2. After book II, chapter 9, 429 b 16 it belongs to the family λ.

The manuscript was not cited by Tiendelenburg, Torstrik, Biehl, Apelt, and Ross in his critical editions of the treatise On the Soul. This means the manuscript is not of high value. Currently it is housed at the Vatican Library (gr. 1339) at Rome.

Other manuscripts 

 Codex Vaticanus 253
 Codex Vaticanus 260
 Codex Coislinianus 386
 Codex Ambrosianus 435

Notes and references

Further reading 

 Paweł Siwek, Aristotelis tractatus De anima graece et latine, Desclée, Romae 1965.

Manuscripts of the Vatican Library
14th-century manuscripts
Aristotelian manuscripts